Lilian Hébert is a French rugby league footballer who represented France at the 1995 World Cup.
He made his first steps in rugby league in Vernajoul, which also produced names such as Jacques Moliner, Claude Sirvent and Christophe Moly.

Hébert played for AS Carcassonne.

After his retirement as player, he is in the restauration business, opening restaurants named "Le Lounge, "Tivoli" and later "Concept" in Limoux.

References

Living people
French rugby league players
France national rugby league team players
Rugby league props
AS Carcassonne players
1971 births